Klingebach is a river of Hesse, Germany. It flows into the Reiherbach near Waldeck.

See also
List of rivers of Hesse

Rivers of Hesse
Rivers of Germany